John Powell may refer to:

Politics and law
 John Powell (MP for Cardigan) (died 1590s), MP for Cardigan
 John Powell (1645–1713), English Member of Parliament for Gloucester, 1685–1689
 John Joseph Powell (1816–1891), British Member of Parliament for Gloucester, 1862–1865
 John Enoch Powell (1912–1998), British politician
 John Powell (Canadian politician) (1809–1881), mayor of Toronto
 John A.H. Powell (died 1843), political figure in upper Canada
 John Powell (judge) ( – 1696), Welsh judge
 John Blake Powell (1870–1923), Irish judge
John William Powell (politician) (1928–2010), American politician

Sports
 John Powell (footballer, born 1892) (1892–1961), English footballer
 John Powell (footballer, born 1936) (1936–2017), English semi-professional footballer
 John Powell (Australian footballer) (born 1937), Australian footballer for Collingwood and Fitzroy
 John Powell (weightlifter) (1931–2008), Australian Olympic weightlifter
 Jackie Powell (1871–1955), South African rugby union player
 John Powell (cricketer) (1904–1959), New Zealand cricketer
 John Powell (discus thrower) (1947–2022), American discus thrower
 Jack Powell (runner) (1910–1982), English athlete

Others
 Joseph Powell (painter) (1780–1833), English artist and teacher, sometimes called "John Powell"
 John Wesley Powell (1834–1902), American geologist and explorer
 John Powell (musician) (1882–1963), American pianist, composer, and eugenicist who promoted white separatist ideologies
 John Powell (film composer) (born 1963), British composer
 John Powell (physicist) (1923–1996), British physicist, creator of the EMI brain scanner
 John W. Powell (1919–2008), American publisher of China Weekly Review, tried for sedition in 1956
 John A. Powell (born 1947), American academic
 John Powell (Jesuit) (1925–2009), American priest and author
 John Frederick Powell (1915–2008), Royal Air Force officer
 John Hare Powel (1786–1856), American agriculturist

See also
Jack Powell (disambiguation)